The Rukmini Devi Temple is a temple dedicated to Hindu goddess Rukmini, situated in Dwarka, Gujarat, India.

It is a richly carved temple decorated with sculptures of gods and goddesses on the exterior with the sanctum housing the main image of Rukmini. Carved naratharas (human figures) and carved gajatharas (elephants) are depicted in panels at the base of the tower.

The present structure of temple is inferred to belong to the 19th century.

The temple is also known for its jal daan (water offering) custom where devotees are asked to donate water to temple.

The sanctum of the temple has a beautiful marble idol of Devi Rukmani, with four hands holding Shanka, Chakra, Gada and Padma.

It is dedicated to Goddess Rukmini (Lord Krishna's chief queen, beloved consort and the incarnation of Devi Lakshmi in Dvapara Yuga). The temple is said to be 2,500 years old but in its present form it is inferred to belong to the 12th century.

The yatra to Dwarka is completed only after you take darshan of Dwarkeshwari Rukmini Maharani

Legends
A legend is narrated to justify separate dwelling temples, far away from each other, for Rukmini and her husband Krishna. It is said that at the request of sage Durvasa (who was renowned for his short temper and bestowing curses) Krishna and Rukmini pulled a chariot taking sage Durvasa to their house for dinner. On the way, when Rukmini asked for water to quench her thirst, Krishna drew Ganges water by prodding the ground with his toe for her to drink. Rukmini quenched her thirst with the Ganges water. But Durvasa felt insulted as Rukmini did not offer him water to drink first. He, therefore, cursed her that she would live separately from her husband.

References

Dwarka
Hindu temples in Gujarat
Monuments of National Importance in Gujarat